Dihydropyridine calcium channel blockers  are derivatives of 1,4-dihydropyridine that are used as L-type calcium channel blockers. They are used in the treatment of hypertension.

Class members
Compared with certain other L-type calcium channel blockers (for example those of the phenylalkylamine class such as verapamil) that have significant action at the heart, they are relatively vascular selective in their mechanism of action in lowering blood pressure.

Dihydropyridine class L-type calcium channel blockers include, in alphabetical order (brand names vary in different countries):

The pharmaceutical drug finerenone is also a dihydrophyridine derivative, but does not act as a calcium channel blocker but as an antimineralocorticoid.

See also
 Calcium channel blocker (including section on non-dihydropyridine calcium channel blockers)
 Calcium channel
 Dihydropyridine receptor

References

Calcium channel blockers